A Dictionary of Similes is a dictionary of similes written by the American writer and newspaperman Frank J. Wilstach. In 1916, Little, Brown and Company in Boston published Wilstach's A Dictionary of Similes, a compilation he had been working on for more than 20 years. It included more than 15,000 examples from more than 800 authors, indexing them under more than 3,000 topics and, where possible, identifying their first use.

Writing 
In the preface (and in interviews about the book) Wilstach told how he started working on the compilation in 1894:

He described how, while traveling across the country in his role as a theatrical agent, he would visit libraries in many cities, pulling quotations from books in the libraries and in his own extensive collection of books. (There are at least three books from his own collection that have been digitized as part of the Google Books project, complete with his underlining and annotation of terms.)

Reviews 
The book was widely reviewed and widely praised. Reviewers said it deserved a place on the shelves of teachers, writers, speakers, and students alongside Roget's Thesaurus and Bartlett's Familiar Quotations. The New York Times Review of Books said it "will be found indispensable for every library, public or private." Life magazine used its own similes to describe Wilstach:

In the most extensive review of A Dictionary of Similes, Lawrence Gilman of the North American Review called the book "unprecedented and delightful" and "a gigantic and staggering undertaking." "[W]e can think of no one," wrote Gilman, "who might have accomplished this gargantuan adventure more satisfactorily than Mr. Wilstach: for he has shown liberality, fine taste, and an admirable susceptibility to contemporary excellence.” Gilman, however, questioned how valuable the book would be to good writers:

Wilstach addressed this issue in his usual breezy and whimsical style in the preface to the second edition of the book, in 1924:

Legacy 

Wilstach's diligence in compiling the dictionary won him praise. Joyce Kilmer, whose 1913 poem Trees began with one of the best known similes—"I think that I shall never see / A poem lovely as a tree"—wrote a lengthy profile of Wilstach for the New York Times Magazine with the subtitle "Frank J. Wilstach's Ardent and Relentless Hunt for This Elusive Figure of Speech Results in a Remarkable Collection."

Kilmer, who himself engaged in lexicographic work on Funk and Wagnalls' The Standard Dictionary, had provided pre-publication advice to Wilstach on his manuscript of the dictionary. Wilstach had also received advice from Ambrose Bierce, who he had known during his days in the Bay Area. In a 1908 letter to Wilstach, Bierce wrote "Luck to your project of publishing a book of Wilstachian thinglets. May its shadow be flung broadly athwart the land!"

Columnist Franklin P. Adams published a poem—"Lines on Reading Frank J. Wilstach's 'A Dictionary of Similes'"—in his syndicated column "The Conning Tower":

Following the publication of the enlarged 1924 edition, Wilstach continued to collect new similes, producing an annual selection of the best similes of the year that appeared in the Times and other papers. Several of his columns in the Times Magazine focused on similes and slang in specific fields, particularly theater and film.

References 

1916 non-fiction books
Books of quotations